The Tallangatta and District Football League (TDFL) is an Australian rules football competition in north-east Victoria and the southern border area of Riverina region of the New South Wales. The clubs compete across four competitions, two of which are age restricted (Under 17s, and Under 14s).

Since 1980 the "Tallangatta & District Netball Association (TDNA)" has run in conjunction with the Tallangatta & District Football League. The clubs compete across six competitions, three of which are age restricted (18 & Under, 15 & Under, and 13 & Under).

Today all of the 12 clubs across both the TDFL & TDNA are joint football–netball clubs, with the overall best club across all football and netball competitions for the season awarded the Club Championship.

History

Origins
In 1944 the League ran an unofficial competition, Fernvale Football Club were the unofficial Premiers that year defeating Sandy Creek Football Club by 51 points at Eskdale.

Founding
The Tallangatta and District Football League was officially formed in 1945 comprising six teams and kicked off on 21 April 1945. The final ladder positions for the 1945 season were as follows, with the top four clubs playing finals:
 1st: Tallangatta Football Club
 2nd: Mitta-Eskdale Football Club
 3rd: Fernvale Football Club
 4th: Sandy Creek Football Club
 5th: Bethanga Football Club
 6th: Granya Football Club

The 1945 Grand Final took place on Saturday 21 July, and saw the Tallangatta Magpies (4.7.31) defeat Fernvale (2.9.21) at the Sandy Creek Recreation Reserve (Sandy Creek, Victoria) to become the League's first official Premiers.

New millennium, new clubs
Following the exodus by two clubs (Culcairn Lions & Holbrook Brookers) to the Hume Football League in the 1990s, the league's number of clubs remained at eight to start the new millennium. At this time of the seven Indigo Shire based clubs only three competed in the Tallangatta & District Football League (Barnawartha Tigers, Kiewa-Sandy Creek Hawks, & Yackandandah Roos). While of the four remaining clubs three competed in the Ovens & King Football League (Beechworth Bombers, Chiltern Swans, & Rutherglen-Corowa Cats) and one in the Coreen & District Football League (Wahgunyah Tigers).

The Chiltern Swans joined the league from the 2003 season, they were the first new club to join the league since the Thurgoona Bulldogs since 1988. The Swans had spent the past 49 years with the Ovens & King Football League, during this time they had won a total of 10 senior football premierships (1957, 1958, 1968, 1971, 1972, 1982, 1983, 1994, 1996, 1998).

In 2003 both the Beechworth Bombers & Rutherglen Cats applied for an application to join the Tallangatta & District Football League but were refused by their current league's board, Ovens & King Football League. Seeking a new home the clubs took their appeal to the Victoria Country Football League and won the right to join the Tallangatta & District Football League from the 2004 season. While Rutherglen were unable to achieve the ultimate success in the Ovens and King Football League they were allowed to keep the Cats as their moniker along with the "Geelong-Style" Navy & White home jumper. Beechworth claimed the O&K flag on 14 occasions (1912, 1913, 1914, 1937, 1938, 1939, 1950, 1951, 1956, 1961, 1974, 1979, 2000, 2001) but were left with no choice then to find a new moniker and jumper, because the Dederang-Mt. Beauty Football Club already used the Bombers as their moniker along with the "Essendon-Style" Red & Black home jumper. Prior to the start of the 2004 season the club unveiled their new identity, they adopted the Bushrangers as their moniker along with the "Port Melbourne-Style" Blue & Red home jumper.

The Wahgunyah Tigers were granted permission to join from the 2008 season after the Coreen & District Football League went into recess at the conclusion of the 2007 season, having won 7 senior football premierships over their 51 years with the league (1948, 1949, 1968, 1997, 1998, 2002, 2004). Because the Barnawartha Football Club already used the Tigers as their moniker along with the "Richmond-Style" Yellow & Black home jumper. Wahgunyah were left with no choice but to find a new moniker and jumper. Prior to the start of the 2008 season the club unveiled their new identity, they adopted the Lions as their moniker along with the "Brisbane Lions-Style" Maroon, Blue & Gold home jumper.

Recent Premiership years

note: UR=Unknown result

Current finals system
Since 1974 the TDFL has used the "McIntyre system". The final series is played over four weekends, with the grand final traditionally being played on the second weekend of September. Also the TDFL board deems that all finals will be held at the natural venue of the Sandy Creek Recreation Reserve (Sandy Creek, Victoria), with all finals for both football and netball played at the one venue during each final day. The  Grand Final  since 1971 has also been held at Sandy Creek Recreation Reserve (Sandy Creek, Victoria), commonly referred to by locals as "The MCG of the Bush" for its large playing surface and picturesque surroundings. The last finals match held away from Sandy Creek was the "1989 second semi-final" held at Bunton Park (North Albury, New South Wales), and the last grand final match held away from Sandy Creek was the "1970 Grand Final" held at the Barnawartha Recreation Reserve (Barnawartha, Victoria).

Clubs

Former clubs

Timeline

League honours and records
{| class="wikitable sortable" style="width:100%; text-align:left;font-size:65%;"
! width="250"|Club / Overall premierships
! style="color:black; background:#89CFF0;" width="15" | 
! width="15" | 
! width="15" | 
! width="15" | 
! width="15" | 
! style="color:black; background:#FFC0CB;" width="15" | 
! width="15" | 
! width="15" | 
! width="15" | 
! width="15" | 
! width="15" | 
! width="15" | 
! style="color:black; background:#fff68f;" width="15" | 
|-
| colspan="14" align="center"|Currently there are some premiers which are undocumented and as such unknown. (See bottom of table for unknown Premiership years.)
|-
!  | Bandiana
! style="color:black; background:#89CFF0;" width="50" | 00
! width="50" | 00
! width="50" | 00
! style="background:#F5F5F5;" style="color:#CCCCCC;" width="50" | N/A
! style="background:#F5F5F5;" style="color:#CCCCCC;" width="50" | N/A
! style="color:black; background:#FFC0CB;" width="50" | 00
! style="background:#F5F5F5;" style="color:#CCCCCC;" width="50" | N/A
! style="background:#F5F5F5;" style="color:#CCCCCC;" width="50" | N/A
! style="background:#F5F5F5;" style="color:#CCCCCC;" width="50" | N/A
! style="background:#F5F5F5;" style="color:#CCCCCC;" width="50" | N/A
! style="background:#F5F5F5;" style="color:#CCCCCC;" width="50" | N/A
! style="background:#F5F5F5;" style="color:#CCCCCC;" width="50" | N/A
! style="color:black; background:#fff68f;" width="50" | 00
|-
!  | Barnawartha
! style="color:black; background:#89CFF0;" width="50" | 11
! width="50" | 
! width="50" | 
! width="50" | 
! width="50" | 
! style="color:black; background:#FFC0CB;" width="50" | 22
! width="50" | 
! width="50" | 
! width="50" | 
! width="50" | 
! width="50" | 
! width="50" | 
! style="color:black; background:#fff68f;" width="50" | 33
|-
!  | Beechworth
! style="color:black; background:#89CFF0;" width="50" | 04
! width="50" | 
! width="50" | 00
! width="50" | 
! width="50" | 
! style="color:black; background:#FFC0CB;" width="50" | 00
! width="50" | 00
! width="50" | 00
! width="50" | 00
! width="50" | 00
! width="50" | 00
! width="50" | 00
! style="color:black; background:#fff68f;" width="50" | 04
|-
!  | Bogong
! style="color:black; background:#89CFF0;" width="50" | 00
! width="50" | 00
! style="background:#F5F5F5;" style="color:#CCCCCC;" width="50" | N/A
! style="background:#F5F5F5;" style="color:#CCCCCC;" width="50" | N/A
! style="background:#F5F5F5;" style="color:#CCCCCC;" width="50" | N/A
! style="color:black; background:#FFC0CB;" width="50" | 00
! style="background:#F5F5F5;" style="color:#CCCCCC;" width="50" | N/A
! style="background:#F5F5F5;" style="color:#CCCCCC;" width="50" | N/A
! style="background:#F5F5F5;" style="color:#CCCCCC;" width="50" | N/A
! style="background:#F5F5F5;" style="color:#CCCCCC;" width="50" | N/A
! style="background:#F5F5F5;" style="color:#CCCCCC;" width="50" | N/A
! style="background:#F5F5F5;" style="color:#CCCCCC;" width="50" | N/A
! style="color:black; background:#fff68f;" width="50" | 00
|-
!  | Bullioh Valley
! style="color:black; background:#89CFF0;" width="50" | 01
! width="50" | 
! width="50" | 00
! width="50" | 00
! style="background:#F5F5F5;" style="color:#CCCCCC;" width="50" | N/A
! style="color:black; background:#FFC0CB;" width="50" | 00
! style="background:#F5F5F5;" style="color:#CCCCCC;" width="50" | N/A
! style="background:#F5F5F5;" style="color:#CCCCCC;" width="50" | N/A
! style="background:#F5F5F5;" style="color:#CCCCCC;" width="50" | N/A
! style="background:#F5F5F5;" style="color:#CCCCCC;" width="50" | N/A
! style="background:#F5F5F5;" style="color:#CCCCCC;" width="50" | N/A
! style="background:#F5F5F5;" style="color:#CCCCCC;" width="50" | N/A
! style="color:black; background:#fff68f;" width="50" | 01
|-
!  | Chiltern
! style="color:black; background:#89CFF0;" width="50" | 00
! width="50" | 00
! width="50" | 00
! width="50" | 00
! width="50" | 00
! style="color:black; background:#FFC0CB;" width="50" | 08
! width="50" | 00
! width="50" | 
! width="50" | 00
! width="50" | 
! width="50" | 
! width="50" | 
! style="color:black; background:#fff68f;" width="50" | 08
|-
!  | Culcairn
! style="color:black; background:#89CFF0;" width="50" | 04
! width="50" | 
! width="50" | 
! width="50" | 
! width="50" | 
! style="color:black; background:#FFC0CB;" width="50" | 03
! width="50" | 
! width="50" | 
! style="background:#F5F5F5;" style="color:#CCCCCC;" width="50" | N/A
! style="background:#F5F5F5;" style="color:#CCCCCC;" width="50" | N/A
! style="background:#F5F5F5;" style="color:#CCCCCC;" width="50" | N/A
! style="background:#F5F5F5;" style="color:#CCCCCC;" width="50" | N/A
! style="color:black; background:#fff68f;" width="50" | 07
|-
!  | Dederang
! style="color:black; background:#89CFF0;" width="50" | 02
! width="50" | 
! width="50" | 00
! width="50" | 00
! style="background:#F5F5F5;" style="color:#CCCCCC;" width="50" | N/A
! style="color:black; background:#FFC0CB;" width="50" | 00
! style="background:#F5F5F5;" style="color:#CCCCCC;" width="50" | N/A
! style="background:#F5F5F5;" style="color:#CCCCCC;" width="50" | N/A
! style="background:#F5F5F5;" style="color:#CCCCCC;" width="50" | N/A
! style="background:#F5F5F5;" style="color:#CCCCCC;" width="50" | N/A
! style="background:#F5F5F5;" style="color:#CCCCCC;" width="50" | N/A
! style="background:#F5F5F5;" style="color:#CCCCCC;" width="50" | N/A
! style="color:black; background:#fff68f;" width="50" | 02
|-
!  | Dederang-Mt. Beauty
! style="color:black; background:#89CFF0;" width="50" | 09
! width="50" | 
! width="50" | 
! width="50" | 00
! width="50" | 
! style="color:black; background:#FFC0CB;" width="50" | 08
! width="50" | 
! width="50" | 
! width="50" | 00
! width="50" | 
! width="50" | 00
! width="50" | 00
! style="color:black; background:#fff68f;" width="50" | 17
|-
!  | Eskdale
! style="color:black; background:#89CFF0;" width="50" | 00
! width="50" | 00
! style="background:#F5F5F5;" style="color:#CCCCCC;" width="50" | N/A
! style="background:#F5F5F5;" style="color:#CCCCCC;" width="50" | N/A
! style="background:#F5F5F5;" style="color:#CCCCCC;" width="50" | N/A
! style="color:black; background:#FFC0CB;" width="50" | 00
! style="background:#F5F5F5;" style="color:#CCCCCC;" width="50" | N/A
! style="background:#F5F5F5;" style="color:#CCCCCC;" width="50" | N/A
! style="background:#F5F5F5;" style="color:#CCCCCC;" width="50" | N/A
! style="background:#F5F5F5;" style="color:#CCCCCC;" width="50" | N/A
! style="background:#F5F5F5;" style="color:#CCCCCC;" width="50" | N/A
! style="background:#F5F5F5;" style="color:#CCCCCC;" width="50" | N/A
! style="color:black; background:#fff68f;" width="50" | 00
|-
!  | Fernvale
! style="color:black; background:#89CFF0;" width="50" | 01
! width="50" | 
! style="background:#F5F5F5;" style="color:#CCCCCC;" width="50" | N/A
! style="background:#F5F5F5;" style="color:#CCCCCC;" width="50" | N/A
! style="background:#F5F5F5;" style="color:#CCCCCC;" width="50" | N/A
! style="color:black; background:#FFC0CB;" width="50" | 00
! style="background:#F5F5F5;" style="color:#CCCCCC;" width="50" | N/A
! style="background:#F5F5F5;" style="color:#CCCCCC;" width="50" | N/A
! style="background:#F5F5F5;" style="color:#CCCCCC;" width="50" | N/A
! style="background:#F5F5F5;" style="color:#CCCCCC;" width="50" | N/A
! style="background:#F5F5F5;" style="color:#CCCCCC;" width="50" | N/A
! style="background:#F5F5F5;" style="color:#CCCCCC;" width="50" | N/A
! style="color:black; background:#fff68f;" width="50" | 01
|-
!  | Granya
! style="color:black; background:#89CFF0;" width="50" | 03
! width="50" | 
! style="background:#F5F5F5;" style="color:#CCCCCC;" width="50" | N/A
! style="background:#F5F5F5;" style="color:#CCCCCC;" width="50" | N/A
! style="background:#F5F5F5;" style="color:#CCCCCC;" width="50" | N/A
! style="color:black; background:#FFC0CB;" width="50" | 00
! style="background:#F5F5F5;" style="color:#CCCCCC;" width="50" | N/A
! style="background:#F5F5F5;" style="color:#CCCCCC;" width="50" | N/A
! style="background:#F5F5F5;" style="color:#CCCCCC;" width="50" | N/A
! style="background:#F5F5F5;" style="color:#CCCCCC;" width="50" | N/A
! style="background:#F5F5F5;" style="color:#CCCCCC;" width="50" | N/A
! style="background:#F5F5F5;" style="color:#CCCCCC;" width="50" | N/A
! style="color:black; background:#fff68f;" width="50" | 03
|-
!  | Holbrook
! style="color:black; background:#89CFF0;" width="50" | 03
! width="50" | 
! width="50" | 
! width="50" | 00
! width="50" | 00
! style="color:black; background:#FFC0CB;" width="50" | 08
! width="50" | 
! width="50" | 
! style="background:#F5F5F5;" style="color:#CCCCCC;" width="50" | N/A
! width="50" | 
! width="50" | 
! width="50" | 00
! style="color:black; background:#fff68f;" width="50" | 11
|-
!  | Kergunyah
! style="color:black; background:#89CFF0;" width="50" | 03
! width="50" | 
! width="50" | 00
! width="50" | 00
! style="background:#F5F5F5;" style="color:#CCCCCC;" width="50" | N/A
! style="color:black; background:#FFC0CB;" width="50" | 00
! style="background:#F5F5F5;" style="color:#CCCCCC;" width="50" | N/A
! style="background:#F5F5F5;" style="color:#CCCCCC;" width="50" | N/A
! style="background:#F5F5F5;" style="color:#CCCCCC;" width="50" | N/A
! style="background:#F5F5F5;" style="color:#CCCCCC;" width="50" | N/A
! style="background:#F5F5F5;" style="color:#CCCCCC;" width="50" | N/A
! style="background:#F5F5F5;" style="color:#CCCCCC;" width="50" | N/A
! style="color:black; background:#fff68f;" width="50" | 03
|-
!  | Kiewa
! style="color:black; background:#89CFF0;" width="50" | 00
! width="50" | 00
! width="50" | 00
! style="background:#F5F5F5;" style="color:#CCCCCC;" width="50" | N/A
! style="background:#F5F5F5;" style="color:#CCCCCC;" width="50" | N/A
! style="color:black; background:#FFC0CB;" width="50" | 00
! style="background:#F5F5F5;" style="color:#CCCCCC;" width="50" | N/A
! style="background:#F5F5F5;" style="color:#CCCCCC;" width="50" | N/A
! style="background:#F5F5F5;" style="color:#CCCCCC;" width="50" | N/A
! style="background:#F5F5F5;" style="color:#CCCCCC;" width="50" | N/A
! style="background:#F5F5F5;" style="color:#CCCCCC;" width="50" | N/A
! style="background:#F5F5F5;" style="color:#CCCCCC;" width="50" | N/A
! style="color:black; background:#fff68f;" width="50" | 00
|-
!  | Kiewa-Sandy Creek
! style="color:black; background:#89CFF0;" width="50" | 28
! width="50" | 
! width="50" | 
! width="50" | 
! width="50" | 
! style="color:black; background:#FFC0CB;" width="50" | 24
! width="50" | 
! width="50" | 
! width="50" | 
! width="50" | 
! width="50" | 
! width="50" | 
! style="color:black; background:#fff68f;" width="50" | 52
|-
!  | Lavington
! style="color:black; background:#89CFF0;" width="50" | 08
! width="50" | 
! width="50" | 
! width="50" | 
! style="background:#F5F5F5;" style="color:#CCCCCC;" width="50" | N/A
! style="color:black; background:#FFC0CB;" width="50" | 00
! style="background:#F5F5F5;" style="color:#CCCCCC;" width="50" | N/A
! style="background:#F5F5F5;" style="color:#CCCCCC;" width="50" | N/A
! style="background:#F5F5F5;" style="color:#CCCCCC;" width="50" | N/A
! style="background:#F5F5F5;" style="color:#CCCCCC;" width="50" | N/A
! style="background:#F5F5F5;" style="color:#CCCCCC;" width="50" | N/A
! style="background:#F5F5F5;" style="color:#CCCCCC;" width="50" | N/A
! style="color:black; background:#fff68f;" width="50" | 08
|-
!  | Lavington Rangers
! style="color:black; background:#89CFF0;" width="50" | 00
! width="50" | 00
! width="50" | 00
! width="50" | 00
! style="background:#F5F5F5;" style="color:#CCCCCC;" width="50" | N/A
! style="color:black; background:#FFC0CB;" width="50" | 00
! style="background:#F5F5F5;" style="color:#CCCCCC;" width="50" | N/A
! style="background:#F5F5F5;" style="color:#CCCCCC;" width="50" | N/A
! style="background:#F5F5F5;" style="color:#CCCCCC;" width="50" | N/A
! style="background:#F5F5F5;" style="color:#CCCCCC;" width="50" | N/A
! style="background:#F5F5F5;" style="color:#CCCCCC;" width="50" | N/A
! style="background:#F5F5F5;" style="color:#CCCCCC;" width="50" | N/A
! style="color:black; background:#fff68f;" width="50" | 00
|-
!  | Mitta Town
! style="color:black; background:#89CFF0;" width="50" | 00
! width="50" | 00
! style="background:#F5F5F5;" style="color:#CCCCCC;" width="50" | N/A
! style="background:#F5F5F5;" style="color:#CCCCCC;" width="50" | N/A
! style="background:#F5F5F5;" style="color:#CCCCCC;" width="50" | N/A
! style="color:black; background:#FFC0CB;" width="50" | 00
! style="background:#F5F5F5;" style="color:#CCCCCC;" width="50" | N/A
! style="background:#F5F5F5;" style="color:#CCCCCC;" width="50" | N/A
! style="background:#F5F5F5;" style="color:#CCCCCC;" width="50" | N/A
! style="background:#F5F5F5;" style="color:#CCCCCC;" width="50" | N/A
! style="background:#F5F5F5;" style="color:#CCCCCC;" width="50" | N/A
! style="background:#F5F5F5;" style="color:#CCCCCC;" width="50" | N/A
! style="color:black; background:#fff68f;" width="50" | 00
|-
!  | Mitta United
! style="color:black; background:#89CFF0;" width="50" | 36
! width="50" | 
! width="50" | 
! width="50" | 
! width="50" | 
! style="color:black; background:#FFC0CB;" width="50" | 06
! width="50" | 
! width="50" | 
! width="50" | 00
! width="50" | 
! width="50" | 
! width="50" | 00
! style="color:black; background:#fff68f;" width="50" | 42
|-
!  | Mt. Beauty
! style="color:black; background:#89CFF0;" width="50" | 00
! width="50" | 00
! width="50" | 00
! width="50" | 00
! style="background:#F5F5F5;" style="color:#CCCCCC;" width="50" | N/A
! style="color:black; background:#FFC0CB;" width="50" | 00
! style="background:#F5F5F5;" style="color:#CCCCCC;" width="50" | N/A
! style="background:#F5F5F5;" style="color:#CCCCCC;" width="50" | N/A
! style="background:#F5F5F5;" style="color:#CCCCCC;" width="50" | N/A
! style="background:#F5F5F5;" style="color:#CCCCCC;" width="50" | N/A
! style="background:#F5F5F5;" style="color:#CCCCCC;" width="50" | N/A
! style="background:#F5F5F5;" style="color:#CCCCCC;" width="50" | N/A
! style="color:black; background:#fff68f;" width="50" | 00
|-
!  | Murray United
! style="color:black; background:#89CFF0;" width="50" | 00
! width="50" | 00
! style="background:#F5F5F5;" style="color:#CCCCCC;" width="50" | N/A
! style="background:#F5F5F5;" style="color:#CCCCCC;" width="50" | N/A
! style="background:#F5F5F5;" style="color:#CCCCCC;" width="50" | N/A
! style="color:black; background:#FFC0CB;" width="50" | 00
! style="background:#F5F5F5;" style="color:#CCCCCC;" width="50" | N/A
! style="background:#F5F5F5;" style="color:#CCCCCC;" width="50" | N/A
! style="background:#F5F5F5;" style="color:#CCCCCC;" width="50" | N/A
! style="background:#F5F5F5;" style="color:#CCCCCC;" width="50" | N/A
! style="background:#F5F5F5;" style="color:#CCCCCC;" width="50" | N/A
! style="background:#F5F5F5;" style="color:#CCCCCC;" width="50" | N/A
! style="color:black; background:#fff68f;" width="50" | 00
|-
!  | RAEME
! style="color:black; background:#89CFF0;" width="50" | 00
! width="50" | 00
! style="background:#F5F5F5;" style="color:#CCCCCC;" width="50" | N/A
! style="background:#F5F5F5;" style="color:#CCCCCC;" width="50" | N/A
! style="background:#F5F5F5;" style="color:#CCCCCC;" width="50" | N/A
! style="color:black; background:#FFC0CB;" width="50" | 00
! style="background:#F5F5F5;" style="color:#CCCCCC;" width="50" | N/A
! style="background:#F5F5F5;" style="color:#CCCCCC;" width="50" | N/A
! style="background:#F5F5F5;" style="color:#CCCCCC;" width="50" | N/A
! style="background:#F5F5F5;" style="color:#CCCCCC;" width="50" | N/A
! style="background:#F5F5F5;" style="color:#CCCCCC;" width="50" | N/A
! style="background:#F5F5F5;" style="color:#CCCCCC;" width="50" | N/A
! style="color:black; background:#fff68f;" width="50" | 00
|-
!  | Rutherglen
! style="color:black; background:#89CFF0;" width="50" | 01
! width="50" | 00
! width="50" | 00
! width="50" | 00
! width="50" | 
! style="color:black; background:#FFC0CB;" width="50" | 02
! width="50" | 00
! width="50" | 00
! width="50" | 00
! width="50" | 
! width="50" | 00
! width="50" | 
! style="color:black; background:#fff68f;" width="50" | 03
|-
!  | Sandy Creek
! style="color:black; background:#89CFF0;" width="50" | 00
! width="50" | 00
! width="50" | 00
! style="background:#F5F5F5;" style="color:#CCCCCC;" width="50" | N/A
! style="background:#F5F5F5;" style="color:#CCCCCC;" width="50" | N/A
! style="color:black; background:#FFC0CB;" width="50" | 00
! style="background:#F5F5F5;" style="color:#CCCCCC;" width="50" | N/A
! style="background:#F5F5F5;" style="color:#CCCCCC;" width="50" | N/A
! style="background:#F5F5F5;" style="color:#CCCCCC;" width="50" | N/A
! style="background:#F5F5F5;" style="color:#CCCCCC;" width="50" | N/A
! style="background:#F5F5F5;" style="color:#CCCCCC;" width="50" | N/A
! style="background:#F5F5F5;" style="color:#CCCCCC;" width="50" | N/A
! style="color:black; background:#fff68f;" width="50" | 00
|-
!  | South Albury
! style="color:black; background:#89CFF0;" width="50" | 00
! width="50" | 00
! width="50" | 00
! width="50" | 00
! width="50" | 00
! style="color:black; background:#FFC0CB;" width="50" | 00
! width="50" | 00
! width="50" | 00
! style="background:#F5F5F5;" style="color:#CCCCCC;" width="50" | N/A
! style="background:#F5F5F5;" style="color:#CCCCCC;" width="50" | N/A
! style="background:#F5F5F5;" style="color:#CCCCCC;" width="50" | N/A
! style="background:#F5F5F5;" style="color:#CCCCCC;" width="50" | N/A
! style="color:black; background:#fff68f;" width="50" | 00
|-
!  |  Tallangatta
! style="color:black; background:#89CFF0;" width="50" | 05
! width="50" | 
! width="50" | 
! width="50" | 00
! style="background:#F5F5F5;" style="color:#CCCCCC;" width="50" | N/A
! style="color:black; background:#FFC0CB;" width="50" | 00
! style="background:#F5F5F5;" style="color:#CCCCCC;" width="50" | N/A
! style="background:#F5F5F5;" style="color:#CCCCCC;" width="50" | N/A
! style="background:#F5F5F5;" style="color:#CCCCCC;" width="50" | N/A
! style="background:#F5F5F5;" style="color:#CCCCCC;" width="50" | N/A
! style="background:#F5F5F5;" style="color:#CCCCCC;" width="50" | N/A
! style="background:#F5F5F5;" style="color:#CCCCCC;" width="50" | N/A
! style="color:black; background:#fff68f;" width="50" | 05
|-
!  | Tallangatta (Tallangatta Valley: 1978-2009)
! style="color:black; background:#89CFF0;" width="50" | 24
! width="50" | 
! width="50" | 
! width="50" | 
! width="50" | 
! style="color:black; background:#FFC0CB;" width="50" | 14
! width="50" | 
! width="50" | 
! width="50" | 00
! width="50" | 
! width="50" | 
! width="50" | 
! style="color:black; background:#fff68f;" width="50" | 38
|-
!  |  Tawonga
! style="color:black; background:#89CFF0;" width="50" | 00
! width="50" | 00
! style="background:#F5F5F5;" style="color:#CCCCCC;" width="50" | N/A
! style="background:#F5F5F5;" style="color:#CCCCCC;" width="50" | N/A
! style="background:#F5F5F5;" style="color:#CCCCCC;" width="50" | N/A
! style="color:black; background:#FFC0CB;" width="50" | 00
! style="background:#F5F5F5;" style="color:#CCCCCC;" width="50" | N/A
! style="background:#F5F5F5;" style="color:#CCCCCC;" width="50" | N/A
! style="background:#F5F5F5;" style="color:#CCCCCC;" width="50" | N/A
! style="background:#F5F5F5;" style="color:#CCCCCC;" width="50" | N/A
! style="background:#F5F5F5;" style="color:#CCCCCC;" width="50" | N/A
! style="background:#F5F5F5;" style="color:#CCCCCC;" width="50" | N/A
! style="color:black; background:#fff68f;" width="50" | 00
|-
!  | Thurgoona
! style="color:black; background:#89CFF0;" width="50" | 13
! width="50" | 
! width="50" | 
! width="50" | 
! width="50" | 
! style="color:black; background:#FFC0CB;" width="50" | 23
! width="50" | 
! width="50" | 
! width="50" | 
! width="50" | 
! width="50" | 
! width="50" | 
! style="color:black; background:#fff68f;" width="50" | 36
|-
!  | Wahgunyah
! style="color:black; background:#89CFF0;" width="50" | 06
! width="50" | 00
! width="50" | 
! width="50" | 
! width="50" | 
! style="color:black; background:#FFC0CB;" width="50" | 02
! width="50" | 
! width="50" | 
! width="50" | 00
! width="50" | 00
! width="50" | 00
! width="50" | 00
! style="color:black; background:#fff68f;" width="50" | 08
|-
!  | Wodonga Demons
! style="color:black; background:#89CFF0;" width="50" | 05
! width="50" | 
! width="50" | 
! width="50" | 
! width="50" | 
! style="color:black; background:#FFC0CB;" width="50" | 01
! width="50" | 00
! width="50" | 
! style="background:#F5F5F5;" style="color:#CCCCCC;" width="50" | N/A
! style="background:#F5F5F5;" style="color:#CCCCCC;" width="50" | N/A
! style="background:#F5F5F5;" style="color:#CCCCCC;" width="50" | N/A
! style="background:#F5F5F5;" style="color:#CCCCCC;" width="50" | N/A
! style="color:black; background:#fff68f;" width="50" | 06
|-
!  | Wodonga Saints
! style="color:black; background:#89CFF0;" width="50" | 01
! width="50" | 00
! width="50" | 00
! width="50" | 
! width="50" | 00
! style="color:black; background:#FFC0CB;" width="50" | 20
! width="50" | 
! width="50" | 
! width="50" | 00
! width="50" | 
! width="50" | 
! width="50" | 
! style="color:black; background:#fff68f;" width="50" | 21
|-
!  | Yackandandah
! style="color:black; background:#89CFF0;" width="50" | 11
! width="50" | 
! width="50" | 
! width="50" | 
! width="50" | 
! style="color:black; background:#FFC0CB;" width="50" | 17
! width="50" | 
! width="50" | 
! width="50" | 00
! width="50" | 
! width="50" | 
! width="50" | 
! style="color:black; background:#fff68f;" width="50" | 28
|-
| colspan="14" align="center"|"N/A" = Not applicable as this competition was established after the club left the league. 
|-
!  | Unknown TDFL Premiers: 1974-2001
! style="color:black; background:#89CFF0;" width="50" | 31! style="background:#F5F5F5;" style="color:#CCCCCC;" width="50" | N/A! width="50" | 
! width="50" | 
! width="50" | 
! style="color:black; background:#FFC0CB;" width="50" | 00! style="background:#F5F5F5;" style="color:#CCCCCC;" width="50" | N/A! style="background:#F5F5F5;" style="color:#CCCCCC;" width="50" | N/A! style="background:#F5F5F5;" style="color:#CCCCCC;" width="50" | N/A! style="background:#F5F5F5;" style="color:#CCCCCC;" width="50" | N/A! style="background:#F5F5F5;" style="color:#CCCCCC;" width="50" | N/A! style="background:#F5F5F5;" style="color:#CCCCCC;" width="50" | N/A! style="color:black; background:#fff68f;" width="50" | 31|}

Grand final results

The Barton Medal is awarded to the Fairest and the Best player each year. 

Simon Corr of Yackandandah claims to have won 2.5 and is known as one of the competitions greats 

 Netball – A Grade: 1980 to present
 Netball – B Grade: 1980 to present
 Netball – C Grade: 2013 to present
 Netball – D Grade (18 & Under): 1992 to present
 Netball – E Grade (15 & Under): 1992 to present
 Netball – F Grade (13 & Under): 1992 to present

Medalists

 Football – Reserves: 1968 to present
 Football – Thirds (Under 17s): 1974 to present
 Football – Fourths (Under 14s): 1980 to present
 Netball – A Grade: 1980 to present
 Netball – B Grade: 1980 to present
 Netball – C Grade: 2013 to present
 Netball – D Grade (18 & Under): 1992 to present
 Netball – E Grade (15 & Under): 1992 to present
 Netball – F Grade (13 & Under): 1992 to present

Records

 Football – Reserves: 1968 to present
 Football – Thirds (Under 17s): 1974 to present
 Football – Fourths (Under 14s): 1980 to present
 Netball – A Grade: 1980 to present
 Netball – B Grade: 1980 to present
 Netball – C Grade: 2013 to present
 Netball – D Grade (18 & Under): 1992 to present
 Netball – E Grade (15 & Under): 1992 to present
 Netball – F Grade (13 & Under): 1992 to present

Seasons
 1945: TDFL Senior Grade competition starts.
 1968: TDFL Reserve Grade competition starts. (Lavington defeat Tallangatta to become the Leagues first Reserve Grade Premiers)
 1974: TDFL Thirds competition begins.
 1980: TDFL Fourths competition begins. TDNA established with TDNA A Grade & TDNA B Grade competitions begin.
 1992: TDNA D Grade (18 & Under), TDNA E Grade (15 & Under) & TDNA F Grade (13 & Under) competitions begin.
 2013: TDNA C Grade competition begins.

2000–2009
2005 season

2006 season

2007 season

2008 season

2009 season

2010-2019
2010 season

2011 season

2012 season

2013 season

2014 season

 2014 Season: Senior Football Premiers: Kiewa-Sandy Creek (defeated Mitta United 16.12.108 to 14.7.91).
 Minor Premiers: Kiewa-Sandy Creek (Wins: 16, Draws: 0, Losses: 2).
 Wooden Spoon: Tallangatta (Wins: 4, Draws: 0, Losses: 14).
 Barton Medal - Best & Fairest: 33 Votes: Cameron McNeill, Barnawartha.
 Leading Goalkicker: 86 Goals: Samuel Cross, Thurgoona.
 2014 Season: A-Grade NetballPremiers: Thurgoona (defeated Barnawartha 51 to 50).
 Minor Premiers: Thurgoona (Wins: 17, Draws: 0, Losses: 1).
 Wooden Spoon: Dederang-Mt Beauty (Wins: 3, Draws: 0, Losses: 15).
 Best & Fairest: ? Votes: Emma Johnson, Yackandandah.
 Leading Goalscorer: 696 Goals: Lauren Coelli,Thurgoona
 2014 Season: Football & Netball Club Championship Champions''': Thurgoona.

2015 season

2016 season

2017 season

Interleague / community championships
The Tallangatta & District Football League has never won the first division of the Victorian Country Championship / Victorian Community Championship interleague championship. In interleague competition the team wears a blue guernsey, emblazoned with a monogram-style gold "TDFL" initials, with blue and gold trim shorts and blue and gold trim socks.

 The Tallangatta & District Football League left Victorian Community Championships in favour of focusing on a local interleague arrangement in 2016 and are no longer have an Interleague ranking. Their current arrangement is with the Ovens & King Football Netball League & the Hume Australian Football Netball League (NSW)'', where there is only one game being played involving teams "A" & "B" while team "C" enjoy a bye round that season.

Notes

References

External links
Tallangatta & District Football League website
Tallangatta & District Netball Association website

1945 establishments in Australia
Sports leagues established in 1945
Australian rules football competitions in New South Wales
Australian rules football competitions in Victoria (Australia)